The Cheap Seats is an Australian comedy panel television show on Network 10 which premiered on 20 July 2021. The Cheap Seats features selected clips of the previous week's news and television shows accompanied with humorous commentary delivered by the hosts.

Hosts
The Cheap Seats is hosted by Melanie Bracewell and Tim McDonald. Segments are co-hosted by presenters such as Mel Tracina on entertainment, Titus O'Reilly on sport and Natasha Exelby on special events such as the Olympics.

Comedians Josh Earl reported from Tasmania, Nina Oyama from Sydney, Angella Dravid from New Zealand and Rachel Fairburn from the Edinburgh Fringe Festival.

Recurring Segments
 Entertainment: Mel Tracina talks about events which occurred in entertainment during the week.
 Sport: Titus O'Reilly talks about events that occurred in sport during the week.
 Across the Ditch: Unusual news from New Zealand.
 What's on What's on in the Warehouse: The hosts comment on out of context clips from the show What's on in the Warehouse, created by Australian pharmacy chain Chemist Warehouse to promote its products.
 Pacific Update Update: The hosts comment on clips from the TVNZ news show, Pacific Update.
 Crop This!: Unusual tidbits from the world of gardening, usually featuring reports by 7news reporter, Penny McKinlay.
 Mel's markets: funny news relating to the financial market.
 Pencil it in: The hosts highlight strange and unusual events taking place across Australia.

Episodes

Season 1 (2021)

Season 2 (2022)

Awards and nominations

|-
|rowspan="2"|2022
|rowspan="2"|Logie Awards of 2022
|Most Popular New Talent
|Melanie Bracewell
|
|rowspan="2"|
|-
|Most Popular Comedy Program
|The Cheap Seats
|

References

External links
 
 Production website – Working Dog

2021 Australian television series debuts
2020s Australian comedy television series
English-language television shows
Network 10 original programming
Television shows set in Melbourne